1936 Emperor's Cup Final was the 16th final of the Emperor's Cup competition. The final was played at Imperial Japanese Army Toyama School Ground in Tokyo on June 21, 1936. Keio BRB won the championship.

Overview
Keio BRB won their 2nd title, by defeating Bosung College 3–2. Keio BRB was featured a squad consisting of Yukio Tsuda, Teiichi Matsumaru and Hirokazu Ninomiya.

Match details

See also
1936 Emperor's Cup

References

Emperor's Cup
1936 in Japanese football